The men's 1500 metres event at the 2002 Asian Athletics Championships was held in Colombo, Sri Lanka on 10–11 August.

Medalists

Results

Heats

Final

References

2002 Asian Athletics Championships
1500 metres at the Asian Athletics Championships